Barkin is a Hebrew surname, originated as the simplified form of Bar-Kohen, which means "son (of a) Kohen" (Israelite priest of the tribes).

People 
 Dovid Barkin, an American rosh yeshiva
 Elaine Barkin (born 1932), an American composer, writer, and educator
 Ellen Barkin, an American actress
 Thomas Barkin (born 1961), an American banker, and eighth president and CEO of the Federal Reserve Bank of Richmond, Virginia

See also 
 Barkin' Bill Smith, an American singer

Hebrew-language surnames
Jewish surnames